Tokyo 6th district is a constituency of the House of Representatives in the Diet of Japan (national legislature). It is located in Tokyo, and consists of major parts of the City of Setagaya, one of Tokyo's 23 special wards. With 2.18 times as many voters as Tokushima's 1st district, it had the lowest electoral weight throughout Japan in the election of 2005. In 2007 the Supreme Court dismissed a claim that the election in this and other Tokyo districts was unconstitutional and thus invalid. As of September 2012, 486,353 eligible voters were registered in the district, giving them the third lowest electoral weight in the country.

Before the electoral reform of 1994, Setagaya was part of Tokyo 3rd district, a three-member single non-transferable vote (SNTV) constituency. The post-reform single-member constituencies were used in the 1996 election for the first time.

Since its creation, the urban district had been dominated by opposition candidates until the landslide "postal privatization" election of 2005 when Liberal Democratic candidate Takao Ochi was able to defeat Democratic incumbent Yōko Komiyama by a slim margin. Komiyama was reelected via the Tokyo proportional representation block and ran again in Tokyo 6th district in the election of 2009. In 2012, Ochi received only less than a third of the vote but retook the district as the opposition to the LDP splintered. After Democratic representative Kōki Ishii had been stabbed to death in 2002 by a rightwing activist, a by-election was held on April 27, 2003.

List of representatives

Election results

References 

Districts of the House of Representatives (Japan)
Politics of Tokyo